Sarjuiyeh (also Romanized as Sarjū’īyeh and Sar Joo’eyeh; also known as Sarjū’īyeh-ye Bālā) is a village in Abnama Rural District, in the Central District of Rudan County, Hormozgan Province, Iran. At the 2006 census, its population was 3,230, in 695 families.

References 

Populated places in Rudan County